The International Association of Master Penmen, Engrossers and Teachers of Handwriting (IAMPETH) (pronounced "I am Peth") is an international association for practicing and preserving the arts of calligraphy, engrossing and penmanship. IAMPETH was founded in 1949.

IAMPETH maintains an archive of works of past masters (viewable, in person, only to members during the Annual Conference) in addition to online instruction guides on lettering styles such as Copperplate, Spencerian script, Illuminated manuscript production (engrossing) and others. A portion of the organization's collection has been digitally preserved and is available on their Internet Archive profile. An annual conference is held each year during the months of July or August in a US city. The convention consists of various classes, banquets, and demonstrations.

In 2017 IAMPETH introduced a new Certificate Program, replacing the Master Penman Program which was discontinued in 2015. This program allows all members who have been with the organization for three or more years to submit work to be considered for Certificate of Proficiency, Certificate of Excellence, and finally a  Master Penman's Certificate. Current application requirements and associated costs are viewable by members only.

IAMPETH is composed of members from various countries. Dues range from $25 to $55 USD. Membership occasionally closes, temporarily, prior to the Annual Conference.

IAMPETH Goals
Practice and teach the arts of calligraphy, engrossing and fine penmanship
Restore the teaching of penmanship in schools
Improve the handwriting of young people
Preserve and share with others the rich tradition of American Penmanship.
Practice make progress

See also

 Penmanship
 Cursive
 Calligraphy
 Illuminated manuscript (engrossing)

References

External links
 IAMPETH official Website
 

Calligraphy organizations, societies, and schools
Manuscript illuminators
Penmanship
Writing
1949 establishments in New York (state)